The Jensen S-V8 is the most recent car carrying the name Jensen. After a £10 million investment, including Liverpool City Council and the Department of Trade and Industry, the two-seater convertible was launched at the 1998 British International Motor Show, with an initial production run of 300 deposit paid vehicles planned at a selling price of £40,000 each, but by October 1999 it was confirmed that 110 orders had been placed.

The new Merseyside factory in Speke commenced production in August 2001  but troubles with manufacture meant production ceased with only 20 ever leaving the factory and another 18 cars left partially completed. The company went into administration in July 2002.

The Jensen name and partially completed cars were later sold to SV Automotive of Carterton, Oxfordshire, in 2003 who decided to complete the build of 12 of the cars, retaining the others for spares, and finally selling them for £38,070.

Specification

C-V8
A coupe version of the convertible S-V8 was planned, but due to the company's troubles it never saw the light of day bar one prototype.

References

S-V8